Georg Gustav Roskoff (1814–1889) was an Austrian theologian, professor of Old Testament exegesis at Vienna University from 1850 to 1884.

His main work deals with the historical development of dualism in which he traces the figure of the Devil in human thought from the beginnings until his own time. His History of the Devil (1869) is still considered a standard work on the topic, although it has been criticized for repeating Gottfried Christian Voigt's unrealistic figure of nine million victims of the Early Modern witch-trials.

Bibliography 
 Die hebräischen Alterthümer in Briefen, Wien 1857
 Die Simsonfrage nach ihrer Entstehung, Form u. Bedeutung u. der Heraclesmythus, Leipzig 1860
 Geschichte des Teufels. [Added in later editions:] Eine kulturhistorische Satanologie von den Anfängen bis ins 18. Jahrhundert, Leipzig 1869 
 Das Religionswesen der rohesten Naturvölker, Leipzig 1880.

References

External links 
 Allgemeine  Deutsche Biografie
 

1814 births
1889 deaths
19th-century Austrian people
19th-century Protestant theologians
Austrian Protestant theologians
Austrian biblical scholars
Austrian people of Hungarian descent
Writers from Bratislava
Academic staff of the University of Vienna